Marchandiomyces is a genus of fungi in the family Corticiaceae.

Marchandiomyces is named in honour of Louis (Ludwig) Marchand (1807-1843), who was a Luxembourger veterinarian, mycologist, lichenologist, and author.

Marchandiomyces corallinus is a lichenicolous species especially found on lichens of the genus Parmelia. Other species are lignicolous, forming inconspicuous, effused basidiocarps (fruit bodies) on wood.

References

Corticiales
Agaricomycetes genera
Taxa named by David Leslie Hawksworth
Taxa described in 1990